Neoregelia bragarum is a species of flowering plant in the genus Neoregelia. This species is endemic to Brazil.

References

bragarum
Flora of Brazil
Flora of the Atlantic Forest